House of Lies is an American dark comedy created by Matthew Carnahan, which premiered on Showtime on January 8, 2012. The series is based on the book, House of Lies: How Management Consultants Steal Your Watch and Then Tell You the Time, written by Martin Kihn, a former consultant at Booz Allen Hamilton. 

Episodes are sometimes available for on-demand streaming via the Showtime Anytime service several days before their scheduled TV air date. On May 17, 2016, Showtime canceled the series after five seasons.

Series overview

Episodes

Season 1 (2012)

Season 2 (2013)

Season 3 (2014) 

Denotes that individual episode ratings were unavailable, so the Showtime network primetime average is listed instead.

Season 4 (2015)

Season 5 (2016)

References

External links 
 
 

Lists of American comedy television series episodes